

Julius Hans Camillo Friedrich Leo Ludwig von Bernuth (12 August 1897 – 12 July 1942) was a general in the Wehrmacht of Nazi Germany who served during World War II.

On 12 July 1942, while flying in a Fieseler Storch from Army headquarters to XXXX Army Corps headquarters, his aircraft disappeared. Searchers found his remains in the wreckage of the plane at Sumy, on 14 July 1942. He was buried near Stalingrad.

Awards and decorations

 Knight's Cross of the Iron Cross on 5 August 1940 as Oberstleutnant in the general staff and chief of the general staff of the XV. Armeekorps

References

Citations

Bibliography

 

1897 births
1942 deaths
Major generals of the German Army (Wehrmacht)
Recipients of the Knight's Cross of the Iron Cross
German Army personnel killed in World War II
Military personnel from Metz
German Army personnel of World War I
Reichswehr personnel
Recipients of the Iron Cross (1914), 1st class
Victims of aviation accidents or incidents in Ukraine